The Indian state of Madhya Pradesh has two central universities, sixteen state universities, three deemed universities, twenty private university three institutes of national importance, including an IIT. All India Institute of Medical Sciences and an NIT. The state also has an IIM and an IISER and Two NLUs.

The Department of Higher Education under Ministry of Human Resource Development lists 81 centrally funded institutes and 42 central universities. Two central universities, two regional centres of IGNOU (in Jabalpur and Bhopal), and eight centrally funded institutes are located in Madhya Pradesh.

University 

As of August 2011, UGC recognizes fifteen state universities in Madhya Pradesh, of which eleven universities receive financial assistance from central government and UGC in addition to Madhya Pradesh state government. Universities eligible for central assistance are marked with a ✩ in the table below.

Deemed 

 granted deemed university status

Autonomous institutions

Notes

References